Patterson is a city in Madison County, Iowa, United States. The population was 176 at the time of the 2020 census. It is part of the Des Moines–West Des Moines Metropolitan Statistical Area.

History
Patterson was laid out in 1872. It derives its name from Alexander Pattison, the original owner of the town site, but the name was misspelled on the plat and stuck.

Geography
Patterson is located at  (41.348815, -93.880684), along the Middle River.

Demographics

2010 census
As of the census of 2010, there were 130 people in 57 households, including 37 families, in the city. The racial makup of the city was 99.2% White and 0.8% Pacific Islander.

Of the 57 households 29.8% had children under the age of 18 living with them, 47.4% were married couples living together, 7.0% had a female householder with no husband present, 10.5% had a male householder with no wife present, and 35.1% were non-families. 29.8% of households were one person and 10.5% were one person aged 65 or older. The average household size was 2.28 and the average family size was 2.84.

The median age was 43 years. 22.3% of residents were under the age of 18; 3.8% were between the ages of 18 and 24; 30% were from 25 to 44; 21.5% were from 45 to 64; and 22.3% were 65 or older. The gender makeup of the city was 52.3% male and 47.7% female.

2000 census
As of the census of 2000, there were 126 people in 58 households, including 33 families, in the city. The racial makup of the city was 100.00% White.

Of the 58 households 20.7% had children under the age of 18 living with them, 51.7% were married couples living together, 3.4% had a female householder with no husband present, and 41.4% were non-families. 27.6% of households were one person and 6.9% were one person aged 65 or older. The average household size was 2.17 and the average family size was 2.74.

The age distribution was 16.7% under the age of 18, 12.7% from 18 to 24, 24.6% from 25 to 44, 34.1% from 45 to 64, and 11.9% 65 or older. The median age was 42 years. For every 100 females, there were 129.1 males. For every 100 females age 18 and over, there were 118.8 males.

The median household income was $47,500 and the median family income  was $52,500. Males had a median income of $31,607 versus $24,375 for females. The per capita income for the city was $21,457. There were no families and 1.4% of the population living below the poverty line, including no under eighteens and none of those over 64.

Education
The Winterset Community School District operates local public schools.

See also
 KICP

References

Cities in Madison County, Iowa
Cities in Iowa
Des Moines metropolitan area
1872 establishments in Iowa